Kissidougou is a prefecture located in the Faranah Region of Guinea. The capital is Kissidougou. The prefecture covers an area of 8,300 km.² and has a population of 283,609.

Sub-prefectures
The prefecture is divided administratively into 13 sub-prefectures:
 Kissidougou-Centre
 Albadaria
 Banama
 Bardou
 Beindou
 Fermessadou-Pombo
 Firawa
 Gbangbadou
 Kondiadou
 Manfran
 Sangardo
 Yendé-Millimou
 Yombiro

Prefectures of Guinea
Faranah Region